Devon Terrell is an American-Australian actor best known for playing a young Barack Obama in the 2016 biographical film Barry and Arthur in the Netflix original series Cursed.

Early life and education
Terrell was born in Long Beach, California to an African-American father and English Anglo-Indian mother. At age 5, he moved to Perth, Western Australia, growing up in the Forest Lakes estate in Thornlie. After finishing his secondary education at Lynwood Senior High School, he attended Edith Cowan University, specializing in drama education. He graduated from the National Institute of Dramatic Art in 2013.

Career
Terrell's first role was in Steve McQueen's HBO miniseries Codes of Conduct, which was canceled after the pilot was filmed. He then auditioned for Barry, a biopic about Barack Obama's college years. Terrell said that he felt an affinity for Obama and that the president had been his dream role since the age of 19.

To prepare for the role, Terrell worked with a dialect coach and watched Obama's speeches to master his accent and manner of speaking. He was offered the part after one audition. He also trained himself to portray the left-handed Obama, including learning how to write and play basketball with his left hand. He read Obama's book Dreams from My Father three times to get into his mindset, and he received praise for his portrayal when the film was released.

Later, he portrayed Arthur in the Netflix original series Cursed. The first season was released on July 17, 2020.

Terrell currently plays the role of Cliff in Issa Rae's Rap Sh!t, which premiered July 21, 2022 on HBO Max.

Filmography

References

External links

1992 births
Living people
Male actors from Long Beach, California
Male actors from Perth, Western Australia
African-American male actors
21st-century American male actors
21st-century Australian male actors
American emigrants to Australia
Australian people of African-American descent
Australian people of Anglo-Indian descent
Australian people of English descent
Australian people of Indian descent
American people of Anglo-Indian descent
American people of English descent
National Institute of Dramatic Art alumni
Edith Cowan University alumni
American male actors of Indian descent
21st-century African-American people